The Vancouver Art Gallery (VAG) is an art museum in Vancouver, British Columbia, Canada. The museum occupies a  adjacent to Robson Square in downtown Vancouver, making it the largest art museum in Western Canada by building size. Designed by Francis Rattenbury, the building the museum presently occupies was originally opened as a provincial courthouse, before it was re-purposed for museum use in the early 1980s. The building was designated as the Former Vancouver Law Courts National Historic Site of Canada in 1980.

The museum was opened to the public in 1931 in a building designed by architectural firm Sharp and Johnston. The museum expanded its first building once in 1950, before plans were undertaken to move the institution to the former provincial courthouse building. The museum was relocated to the provincial courthouse in 1983. Plans were undertaken by the museum in the late 2000s and 2010s to relocate the institution to a new facility in Larwill Park.

The Vancouver Art Gallery's permanent collection serves as a repository of art for the Lower Mainland region, and has approximately 12,000 works by artists from Canada, and around the world. In addition to exhibiting works from its collection, the museum has also organized and hosted a number of travelling arts exhibitions.

History
In April 1931, the Vancouver Art Gallery Association was established under the provincial Society Act, in order to establish and maintain a museum for the City of Vancouver. The Association opened the art museum to the public at 1145 West Georgia Street on 5 October 1931. The building was designed by architectural firm Sharp and Johnston, and featured four galleries, one of which included a sculpture hall, a lecture hall, and a library.
 
Works by British, and other European artists dominated the works exhibited at the museum at the time of its opening. In 1938, the museum was the one of the buildings occupied by unemployed protesters during a sitdown strike in the weeks leading up to Bloody Sunday. Paintings were not damaged while the protesters occupied the building.

In 1950, the museum conducted renovations to its building, reshaping the design of the building towards an International Style of architecture; with the removal of the building's Art Deco facade. Renovations were also conducted to accommodate the 157 works bequeathed to the museum by Emily Carr, with the building reopened to the public in 1951.

In 1983 the museum was relocated to its present location, the former provincial courthouse. The building continues to be owned by the Government of British Columbia, although the museum occupies the building through a 99-year sublease signed with the City of Vancouver government in 1974; who in turn leases the building from the provincial government. Before the re-purposed building was opened to the public, it was renovated by architect Arthur Erickson at a cost of  million, as a part of his larger three city-block Robson Square redevelopment. The gallery connects to the rest of Robson Square via an underground passage below Robson Street.

A notable feature of the building is a pair of granite lions, placed on either side of the old entrance to the courthouse. They were carved from granite chunks brought from Nelson Island and placed in their current location in 1910. On November 4, 1942, two dynamite blasts damages the rear end of the western lion. The blasts also shattered the windows of surrounding hotels and cause some people to believe the city was under air attack. Two stonecutters who had worked on the original carvings and who were still working, John Whitworth and Herbert Ede, were hired to carve and fit new hindquarters; the join line is still visible. The culprits were never found.

Plans to build a new building for the museum were undertaken in 2004, a result from its need for more exhibition and storage space for its collections. In November 2007, the museum publicly announced plans to move to seek approval from Vancouver City Council to build a new building at Larwill Park, a block formerly occupied by a bus depot on the corner of Cambie and Georgia streets. However, in May 2008, the museum and the City of Vancouver government announced its intention to relocate to an area occupied by the Plaza of Nations. The Vancouver City Council later reversed its decision in April 2013, opting to approve the original proposed site in Larwill Park. In September 2013, the museum formally issued requests for qualifications to construct the new building, receiving responses from 75 architectural firms from 16 countries. In April 2014, Herzog & de Meuron's bid was selected by the museum. The development of the Vancouver Art Gallery's new building is the first project for the architectural firm in the country. Perkins and Will's Vancouver branch was contracted as the project's executive architects.

The cost to construct the building has been estimated to be  million, with the federal and provincial governments expected to provide  million, and the museum expected to raise the rest from public and private donors. Should the museum secure its relocation, the museum would occupy the building under similar arrangements as the former courthouse, with the museum leasing the property from the City of Vancouver. The building was originally planned to be completed in 2020. However, developments for the project stalled due to a funding dispute between the federal and provincial governments. In November 2021, the museum received a $100 million donation from Michael Audain to help fund the new building. The donation was the largest cash donation to a public art museum in Canadian history. However, as of November 2021, the museum still needed to raise another $160 million to fund the project.

Select exhibitions since 2006

The Vancouver Art Gallery has organized and hosted a number of temporary, and travelling exhibitions. A select list of exhibitions held at the museum since 2005 include:

 Brian Jungen (2006)
 Monet to Dali: Modern Masters from the Cleveland Museum of Art (2007)
 KRAZY! The Delirious World of Anime + Comics + Video Games + Art (2008)
 Vermeer, Rembrandt and the Golden Age of Dutch Art Masterpieces from The Rijksmuseum (2009)
 Leonardo da Vinci: The Mechanics of Man (2010)
 The Colour of My Dreams: The Surrealist Revolution in Art (2011)
 Collecting Matisse and Modern Masters: The Cone Sisters of Baltimore (2012)
 Beat Nation: Art, Hip Hop and Aboriginal Culture (2012)
 Grand Hotel: Redesigning Modern Life (2013)
 Charles Edenshaw (2013)
 The Forbidden City: Inside the Court of China’s Emperors (2014)
 Unscrolled: Reframing Tradition in Chinese Contemporary Art (2014)
 Cezanne and the Modern: Masterpieces of European Art from the Pearlman Collection (2015)
 How Do I Fit This Ghost in My Mouth? An exhibition by Geoffrey Farmer (2015)
 Embracing Canada: Landscapes from Krieghoff to the Group of Seven (2015)
 Douglas Coupland: Everywhere Is Anywhere Is Anything Is Everything (2015)
 MashUp: The Birth of Modern Culture (2016)
 Picasso: The Artist and His Muses (2016)
 Claude Monet’s Secret Garden (2017)
 Takashi Murakami: The Octopus Eats its Own Leg (2018)
 French Moderns: Monet to Matisse, 1850-1950 (2019)
 Alberto Giacometti: A Line Through Time (2019) 
 Cindy Sherman (2020)
 Jan Wade: Soul Power (2021-22)
 Growing Freedom: The instructions of Yoko Ono / The art of John and Yoko (2022)

Building

The art museum is in the former provincial courthouse for Vancouver. The  neoclassical building was designed by Francis Rattenbury after winning a design competition in 1905. The building was opened as a provincial courthouse in 1911, and operated as such until 1979, with the provincial courts moved to the Law Courts south of the building. The building was designated the Former Vancouver Law Courts National Historic Site of Canada in 1980. Both the main and annex portions of the building are also designated "A" heritage structures by the municipal government. The Vancouver Art Gallery moved into the former courthouse in 1983.

The Centennial Fountain on the Georgia Street side of the building was installed in 1966 to commemorate the centennial of the union of the colonies of Vancouver Island and British Columbia; although it was later removed in 2017 as part of the Georgia Street plaza renovations. Shortly after the provincial courts moved out of the building, the building was renovated for museum use, and as a part of Arthur Erickson's redevelopment of Robson Square. The Annex Building is the only part of the building complex that was not converted for museum use.

The design of the building includes ionic columns, a central dome, formal porticos, and ornate stonework. The building was constructed using marble imported from Alaska, Tennessee, and Vermont. Construction for the building began in 1906 and replaced the previous courthouse at Victory Square. At the time, the building contained 18 courtrooms. An annex designed by Thomas Hooper was added to the western side of the building in 1912. It was declared a heritage site and retains the original judges' benches and walls as they were when the building was a courthouse.

Gathering place
The front lawn and steps of the building has hosted a number of public gatherings and protests. The building serves as the monthly meeting spot for Vancouver's Critical Mass, as well as flash mobs, the Zombie Walk, pro-marijuana rallies, and numerous environmental demonstrations. The steps on both the Robson Street and Georgia Street sides of the building are popular gathering spots for protest rallies. The Georgia Street side is also a popular place in the summertime for people to relax or socialize.

In February 12, 2007, the 2010 Olympic countdown clock was placed in the front lawn of the building. It was open for free for the public to see. The clock has since been disassembled after the games, with one half going to BC Place and the other to Whistler Village.

In June 2021, Cheryle Gunargie created a vigil in honour of the unmarked remains of children discovered at the Kamloops Indian Residential School. The vigil consists of 215 pairs of shoes, one for each of the children whose remains were discovered.

Permanent collection

As of December 2018, the Vancouver Art Gallery's permanent collection had approximately 12,000 works by Canadian, and international artists. The museum's permanent collection is formally owned by the City of Vancouver, with the museum acting as the custodians for the collection under a lease and license agreement. The permanent collection acts as the principal repository of works produced in the Lower Mainland region, with museum acquisitions typically focused on historical and contemporary art from the region. Approximately half of the works in its collection were produced by artists from Western Canada. In addition to art from the region, the collection also has a focus on First Nations art, and art from Asia. The museum's collection is organized into several smaller areas, contemporary art from Asia, photography and conceptual photography, works by indigenous Canadian artists from the region, and artists from Vancouver and British Columbia.

The museum's photography and conceptual art collection includes photographs from the 1950s to the present, and includes photos by the N.E. Thing Co. artist collective, photographers of the Vancouver School of conceptual photography, and other artists including Dan Graham, Andreas Gursky, Thomas Ruff, Cindy Sherman, Robert Smithson, and Thomas Struth. The museum's collection of contemporary Asian art includes works by Eikoh Hosoe, Mariko Mori, Fiona Tan, Jin-me Yoon, Reena Saini Kallat, Song Dong, Wang Du, Wang Jianwei, Yang Fudong, and O Zhang.

Canadian art

Serving as a repository for art for the region, the museum holds a number of works by artists based in the Lower Mainland, in addition to artists based in other regions of British Columbia. The museum's collection includes works from Canadian artists, including members of the Group of Seven, Gathie Falk, Michael Snow, and Joyce Wieland. The museum's collection also features a significant number of works by Emily Carr, dating from 1913 to 1942. The painting Totem Poles, Kitseukla, by Carr, was among the original set of works acquired for the museum's collection prior to opening in 1931. The permanent collections of the Vancouver Art Gallery, along with the collections of the National Gallery of Canada, hold the largest number of works by Carr of any collection in the world.

The museum's also features a collection of indigenous Canadian art from the region, including works from Haida, Heiltsuk, Inuit, Kwakwakaʼwakw, Nuu-chah-nulth, Nuxalk, and Tlingit artists. Regular acquisitions of indigenous Canadian works was undertaken by the museum beginning in the 1980s; with the museum's practices prior to the 1980s typically leaving the acquisition of indigenous Canadian works for the collections of ethnographic, or history museums.

In 2015, George Gund III bequeathed to the museum 37 First Nations works, including totem poles by Ken Mowatt and Norman Tait, drawings by Bill Reid, and thirteen carved works by Robert Davidson. Other works in the museum's indigenous Canadian collection includes works by Sonny Assu, Rebecca Belmore, Dempsey Bob, Dana Claxton, Joe David, Reg Davidson, Beau Dick, Brian Jungen, Marianne Nicolson, and Lawrence Paul Yuxweluptun.

Selected works

Library and archive
The Vancouver Art Gallery Library and Archives is a non-circulating library that specializing in modern, contemporary and Canadian art. Its holdings include more than 50,000 books and exhibition catalogues, 30 journal subscriptions, 5,000 files that document various artists, art forms, and works. Access to the museum's library and archives require a scheduled appointment.

The museum's archives contain the institution's official records since its founding in 1931. In addition to institutional documents, the archives also includes files from B.C. Binning, and the books and serials where Bill Bissett's concrete poetry was published.

Programs 
The Vancouver Art Gallery offers a wide range of public programs throughout the year, including live performances marketed under the FUSE program, scholar's lectures, artist's talks, as well as dance and musical performances. In its most recent year, the gallery has featured over 60 presenters, including historian Timothy Brook, writer Sarah Milroy, and Emily Carr scholar, Gerta Moray. In May 2015, the gallery welcomed architect Jacques Herzog as he presented his first lecture in Canada on architecture and the new Vancouver Art Gallery building.

See also
 List of art museums
 List of museums in British Columbia

References

External links

 
 Vancouver Art Gallery at Google Arts and Culture

Art museums and galleries in British Columbia
Museums in Vancouver
Domes
National Historic Sites in British Columbia
Heritage sites in British Columbia
Francis Rattenbury buildings
Courthouses in Canada
Neoclassical architecture in Canada
Art museums established in 1931
1931 establishments in British Columbia
Heritage buildings in Vancouver